Handique is a surname. Notable people with the surname include: 

Aideu Handique (1920–2002), Indian actress
Bijoy Krishna Handique (1934–2015), Indian politician
Krishna Kanta Handique (1898–1982), Indian Sanskrit scholar
Nabanita Handique, Indian politician
Robin Handique (died 2005), Indian terrorist

See also
Handique Girls College, a constituent college of the University of Guwahati in Assam, India